Tournous-Darré is a commune in the Hautes-Pyrénées department in south-western France.

See also
Communes of the Hautes-Pyrénées department

References

Communes of Hautes-Pyrénées